Ashu Bedra, is an Indian film producer, television producer and actor in the Kannada cinema. He started his career with production as a Kannada TV serial producer in 2008 with Zee Kannada's Radha Kalyana.

Early life
Ashu was born in Uppinangady in Dakshina Kannada district in Karnataka.

Career
Ashu has been a producer for multiple Kannada TV serials like Radha Kalyana (2008), Baduku Jataka Bandi (2011), Sagara Sangama (2014), Sarpa Sambandha (2017), Oggarane Dabbi (2018).

In 2016, Ashu stepped into the Kannada film industry with Simple Suni directed Simple Aaginnond Love Story, a sequel to Simple Agi Ondh Love Story. Since then, he was involved in major TV serials as a producer.

Filmography

Actor

References

External links
 

Living people
Kannada male actors
Kannada film producers
Indian male film actors
21st-century Indian male actors
20th-century births
Year of birth missing (living people)